Helen King (born 1957) is a British classical scholar and advocate for the medical humanities. She is Professor Emerita of Classical Studies at the Open University. She was previously Professor of the History of Classical Medicine and Head of the Department of Classics at the University of Reading.

Early life and education
King was born in 1957. She completed her first degree at University College London in Ancient History and Social Anthropology. She gained her doctorate at UCL in 1985 for a PhD on menstruation in ancient Greece supervised by Sarah C. (Sally) Humphreys. Her thesis was entitled From 'parthenos' to 'gyne': the Dynamics of Category.

Academic career

Having completed her doctorate, King held research fellowships at the universities of Cambridge and Newcastle, taught at the Liverpool Institute of Higher Education for eight years, and moved to Reading on a Wellcome Trust University Award in 1996. From 2008 she was also Visiting Professor at the Peninsula Medical School in Truro. She moved to the Open University to assume the role of Professor of Classical Studies in 2011. She retired in January 2017 and took up the position of Robert E. and Susan T. Rydell Visiting Professor 2017–2018 at Gustavus Adolphus College, St Peter, MN.

King was a Women's Studies Area Advisor to the Oxford Classical Dictionary (1996). She has been a Fellow at the Netherlands Institute for Advanced Studies (2001), a Landsdowne Visiting Lecturer at the University of Victoria, British Columbia (2002), a Visiting Professor at the University of Texas at Austin (2005), a Käthe Leichter Visiting Professor in Women's Studies and Gender Studies at the University of Vienna (2014) and Provost's Distinguished Women Lecturer, Notre Dame, IN (2016). King has appeared on History Cold Case, Tony Robinson's Gods & Monsters, and Harlots, Housewives & Heroines: A 17th Century History for Girls. She has contributed to two episodes of In Our Time on BBC Radio 4, speaking on Galen and The Hippocratic Oath.

Research interests 
Her book Hippocrates' Woman: Reading the Female Body in Ancient Greece (1998) analyses the practice and theory of ancient medicine as relating to women and how it continues to influence thought to the present day.

In her 2007 book, Midwifery, Obstetrics and the Rise of Gynaecology: The Uses of a Sixteenth-Century Compendium, she examined the uses of ancient medicine in a collection of ancient and medieval works on gynecology produced in three editions, the last being in 1597 by Israel Spach, and the different interpretations of this collection up to James Young Simpson in the nineteenth century.

She has also published on the myths of Tithonos, on mermaids, and on the myth/fable of Agnodice, "the first midwife". She has investigated how this story was used to give authority to women in medical roles in various historical periods.

Church of England
King was a member of the General Synod of the Church of England from 1985 to 1993 and from 2021 to 2026. As part of the 'Historical' thematic working group, she contributed to the Church's 2020 teaching document on human sexuality. She supports same-sex marriage.

She has also spoken about the history of Christianity in a podcast for the Historical Association.

Select publications
 Hippocrates' Woman: Reading the Female Body in Ancient Greece (1998); 
Greek and Roman Medicine (2001). 
The Disease of Virgins: Green Sickness, Chlorosis and the Problems of Puberty (2004); 
 Health in Antiquity (2005); 
 Midwifery, Obstetrics and the Rise of Gynaecology: The Uses of a Sixteenth-Century Compendium (2007); 
 Blood, Sweat and Tears: The Changing Concepts of Physiology from Antiquity into Early Modern Europe (with Manfred Horstmansoff and Claus Zittel 2012); 
 La Médecine dans l' Antiquité grecque et romaine (with Véronique Dasen, 2008); 
 The One-Sex Body on Trial: The Classical and Early Modern Evidence (2013); 
Hippocrates Now: The 'Father of Medicine' in the Internet Age (2019);

See also 

 Diophantus of Abae

References

External links

Ancient Magic - Helen King speaking at an event on Ancient Magic at the Institute of Classical Studies on Wednesday 31 October 2018

Academics of Liverpool Hope University
Academics of the Open University
Academics of the University of Reading
Alumni of University College London
British historians
British women historians
English classical scholars
Living people
Women classical scholars
British Anglicans
1957 births
Members of the General Synod of the Church of England